Garborg is a surname. Notable people with the surname include:

Arne Garborg (1851–1924), Norwegian writer
Hulda Garborg (1862–1934), Norwegian writer, novelist, playwright, poet, folk dancer, and theatre instructor, wife of Arne

Norwegian-language surnames